Sandbox Theater is an experimental theater company based in Minneapolis, Minnesota.  

Ryan Hill, Lisa Moreira, Andrew Lawrence Schiff and Heather Stone formed Sandbox Theater in 2005 after working together at 15 Head Theatre Lab.  Hill served as Artistic Director until 2013, when he was replaced by ensemble member Derek Lee Miller. In 2017, company member Peter Heeringa became Artistic Director.

Sandbox Theater is dedicated to creating new work as an ensemble with a rich visual and physical style.

Ensemble Members
Evelyn Digirolamo 2013
Heather Stone 2004
Jaya Robillard 2017
Kristina Fjellman 2012
Matthew Glover 2010
Megan Campbell Lagas 2012
Peter Heeringa 2010
Ryan Hill 2004
Theo Langason 2013
Tim Donahue 2010-2017
Derek Lee Miller 2008-2017
Nicole Devereaux 2010-2013
Lisa Moreira 2004-2012
Andrew Lawrence Schiff 2004-2013
Wade A. Vaughn 2010-2012
Jenna Wyse 2010-2012

Shows
2005: Victoria in Red 
2005: aphasiatica: duet
2006: aphasiatica: solo
2006: Koogoomanooki 
2006: Zelda: Wonderland 
2007: What Remains
2007: War With The Newts 
2008: The Horse, The Bird, The Monkey & The Dancer 
2009: June of Arc 
2009: .faust 
2010: June of Arc remount @ Singled Out: a Festival of Emerging Artists at the Guthrie Theater
2010: Unspeakable Things 
2011: Sandbox Theatre's Fargo 
2011: The Mad Trapper of Rat River 
2012: The Oresteia Project: Queens and Daughters with Hamline University Theater
2012: Beatnik Giselle
2013: This Is A World to Live In
2014: Marie-Jeanne Valet, Who Defeated La Bete du Gevaudan
2014: Killer Inside
2015: War with the Newts
2015: Little Pilot
2015: June of Arc the Film
2016: Queens
2016: The Siege (San Francisco, CA)
2016: 600 Years
2017: Big Money
2017: In the Treetops
2018: Houdini
2018: Words.Do.Move

References

External links
Sandbox Theatre website

Theatre companies in Minneapolis